Hrabar is a Slavic name. Notable people with the name include:

Chernorizets Hrabar (9th century), Bulgarian monk, scholar, and writer
Andrej Hrabar (born 1978), Slovenian rower
Mykola Hrabar (born 1962), Ukrainian politician

See also
 

Surnames of Slavic origin